Eom Hyeon-jeong, also known as Um Hyun-jung, is a South Korean voice actress. She joined the Munhwa Broadcasting Corporation's voice acting division in 1996. It is popular voice acting to MBC's Ojamajo Doremi and Bikkuriman. Currently, Eom Hyeon-jeong is cast in the Korea TV edition of 24 as Sherry Palmer, replacing Penny Johnson Jerald.

Roles

Broadcasting TV
24 (replacing Penny Johnson Jerald, Korea TV edition, MBC)
Bikkuriman (Korea TV edition, MBC)
Ojamajo Doremi (Korea TV edition, MBC)
TV Special Surprise World (MBC)
Culture is Life (MBC)
TV Surprise (MBC)

Movie dubbing
Tomorrow Never Dies (replacing Michelle Yeoh, Korea TV Edition, MBC) Used People (replacing Kathy Bates, Korea TV edition, MBC) Circle of Friends (replacing Minnie Driver, Korea TV edition, MBC) Immortal Beloved (replacing Isabella Rossellini, Korea TV edition, MBC) Ghost (replacing Whoopi Goldberg, Korea TV edition, MBC) Once Around  (replacing Holly Hunter, Korea TV edition, MBC) The Firm (replacing Holly Hunter, Korea TV edition, MBC) Underworld (replacing Kate Bekensale, Korea TV edition, MBC) Copycat (replacing Holly Hunter, Korea TV edition, MBC) Marselle Summer (replacing Natalie Rosselle, Korea TV edition, MBC) The Son's Room (replacing Laura Morante, Korea TV edition, MBC) The Addams Family (replacing Joan Cousak, Korea TV edition, MBC)H2O (replacing Jamie Lee Curtis, Korea TV edition, MBC)Bogus (Korea TV edition, MBC)Ae Soo (Korea TV edition, MBC) Absolute Power (Korea TV edition, SBS)Chicago (replacing Christine Baranski, Korea TV edition, MBC)Cold Mountain (replacing Renée Zellweger, Korea TV edition, MBC)

Gaming
Cupid Empire

Awards
 2007 MBC Drama Awards, Best TV Voice Actor (CSI: Miami'')

See also
Munhwa Broadcasting Corporation
MBC Voice Acting Division

External links
MBC Voice Acting Division Eom Hyeon Jeong Blog (in Korean)
Ad Sound Eom Hyeon Jeong Blog (in Korean)

Living people
South Korean voice actresses
Year of birth missing (living people)
20th-century South Korean actresses